The 2014 SBS Drama Awards is a ceremony honoring the best performances in television on the SBS network for the year 2014. It was held at the COEX Hall D in Samseong-dong, Seoul on December 31, 2014, and hosted by Lee Hwi-jae, Park Shin-hye, and Park Seo-joon.

Nominations and winners
Complete list of nominees and winners:

(Winners denoted in bold)

{| class=wikitable style="width="100%"
|-
! style="width="50%" | 
! style="width="50%" | 
|-
| valign="top" |
Jun Ji-hyun - My Love from the Star as Cheon Song-yi| valign="top" |Lee Jong-suk - Pinocchio as Choi Dal-po/Ki Ha-myung / Doctor Stranger as Park Hoon|-
! 
! 
|-
| valign="top" |Park Yoochun - Three Days as Han Tae-kyungJo In-sung - It's Okay, That's Love as Jang Jae-yeol
Cho Seung-woo - God's Gift - 14 Days as Ki Dong-chan
Jung Ji-hoon (Rain) - My Lovely Girl as Lee Hyun-wook

| valign="top" |Gong Hyo-jin - It's Okay, That's Love as Ji Hae-sooLee Bo-young - God's Gift - 14 Days as Kim Soo-hyun
Park Ha-sun - Three Days as Yoon Bo-won

|-
! 
! 
|-
| valign="top" |Kim Soo-hyun - My Love from the Star as Do Min-joonCha Seung-won - You're All Surrounded as Seo Pan-seok
Kwon Sang-woo - Temptation as Cha Seok-hoon
Lee Jong-suk - Pinocchio as Choi Dal-po/Ki Ha-myung
Lee Seung-gi - You're All Surrounded as Eun Dae-gu/Kim Ji-yong

| valign="top" |Park Shin-hye - Pinocchio as Choi In-haChoi Ji-woo - Temptation as Yoo Se-young
Han Hye-jin - One Warm Word as Na Eun-jin
Jun Ji-hyun - My Love from the Star as Cheon Song-yi
Kim Ji-soo - One Warm Word as Song Mi-kyung

|-
! 
! 
|-
| valign="top" |Lee Je-hoon - Secret Door as Yi SunHan Suk-kyu - Secret Door as King Yeongjo
Lee Sang-woo - Glorious Day as Seo Jae-woo
Ryu Soo-young - Endless Love as Han Gwang-hoon

| valign="top" |Hwang Jung-eum - Endless Love as Seo In-aeLee Ji-ah - Thrice Married Woman as Oh Eun-soo
Park Se-young - Glorious Day as Jung Da-jung
Uhm Ji-won - Thrice Married Woman as Oh Hyun-soo

|-
! 
! 
|-
| valign="top" |Sung Dong-il - It's Okay, That's Love as Jo Dong-minJung Gyu-woon - God's Gift - 14 Days as Hyun Woo-jin
Kim Tae-woo - God's Gift - 14 Days as Han Ji-hoon
Son Hyun-joo - Three Days as Lee Dong-hwi

| valign="top" |So Yi-hyun - Three Days as Lee Cha-youngCha Ye-ryun - My Lovely Girl as Shin Hae-yoon
Krystal Jung - My Lovely Girl as Yoon Se-na

|-
! 
! 
|-
| valign="top" |Shin Sung-rok - My Love from the Star as Lee Jae-kyungJi Jin-hee - One Warm Word as Yoo Jae-hak
Joo Sang-wook - Birth of a Beauty as Han Tae-hee
Lee Jung-jin - Temptation as Kang Min-woo
Lee Sang-yoon - Angel Eyes as Park Dong-joo
Park Hae-jin - My Love from the Star as Lee Hwi-kyung

| valign="top" |Han Ye-seul - Birth of a Beauty as Sa Geum-ran/SaraGo Ara - You're All Surrounded as Eo Soo-sun
Jin Se-yeon - Doctor Stranger as Song Jae-hee/Han Seung-hee
Kang So-ra - Doctor Stranger as Oh Soo-hyun
Ku Hye-sun - Angel Eyes as Yoon Soo-wan
Lee Ha-nui - Modern Farmer as Kang Yoon-hee

|-
! 
! 
|-
| valign="top" |Song Chang-eui - Thrice Married Woman as Jung Tae-wonHa Seok-jin - Thrice Married Woman as Kim Joon-goo
Jung Kyung-ho - Endless Love as Han Gwang-cheol
Kang Seong-min  - Cheongdam-dong Scandal as Bok Soo-ho
Lee Tae-gon - One Well-Raised Daughter as Han Yoon-chan

| valign="top" |Choi Jung-yoon - Cheongdam-dong Scandal as Eun Hyun-sooLee Min-young - You're Only Mine as Go Eun-jung
Lim Seong-eon  - Cheongdam-dong Scandal as Lee Jae-ni
Park Han-byul - One Well-Raised Daughter as Jang Ha-na/Jang Eun-seong
Seo Hyo-rim - Endless Love as Cheon Hye-jin

|-
! 
! 
|-
| valign="top" |Lee Kwang-soo - It's Okay, That's Love as Park Soo-kwangJang Hyun-sung - Three Days as Ham Bong-su
Park Yeong-gyu - My Lovely Girl as Lee Jong-ho
Shin Goo - God's Gift - 14 Days as Choo Byeong-woo

| valign="top" |Jin Kyung - It's Okay, That's Love as Lee Young-jin / Pinocchio as Song Cha-ok
Cha Hwa-yeon - It's Okay, That's Love as Ok-ja
Kim Hye-eun - My Lovely Girl as Oh Hee-seon
Jung Hye-sun - God's Gift - 14 Days as Lee Soon-nyeo

|-
! 
! 
|-
| valign="top" |
Kim Chang-wan - My Love from the Star as Jang Young-mokHan Sang-jin - Birth of a Beauty as Han Min-hyeok
Kim Ji-seok - Angel Eyes as Kang Ji-woon
Sung Ji-ru - You're All Surrounded as Lee Eung-do

| valign="top" |Go Doo-shim - One Warm Word as Kim Na-raLee Il-hwa - Modern Farmer as Yoon Hye-jung
Na Young-hee - My Love from the Star as Yang Mi-yeon
Oh Yoon-ah - You're All Surrounded as Kim Sa-kyung

|-
! 
! 
|-
| valign="top" |Jung Woong-in - Endless Love as Park Young-taeCha In-pyo - Endless Love as Cheon Tae-woong
Choi Won-young - Secret Door as Chae Je-gong
Kang Seok-woo - Glorious Day as Seo Min-sik

| valign="top" |Kim Hye-sun - Cheongdam-dong Scandal as Kang Bok-heeKim Mi-sook - Glorious Day as Han Song-jung
Shim Hye-jin - Endless Love as Min Hye-rin
Yoon Yoo-sun - One Well-Raised Daughter as Joo Hyo-sun

|-
! 
! 
|-
| valign="top" |Lee Deok-hwa - Wonderful Day in October as Lee Shin-jae| valign="top" |Oh Hyun-kyung - A Mother's Choice as Jin So-young|-
! 
! 
|-
| valign="top" |Kim Soo-hyun - My Love from the StarCha Seung-won - You're All Surrounded
Cho Seung-woo - God's Gift - 14 Days
Choi Ji-woo - Temptation
Go Ara - You're All Surrounded
Gong Hyo-jin - It's Okay, That's Love
Han Ye-seul - Birth of a Beauty
Hwang Jung-eum - Endless Love
Jung Ji-hoon (Rain) - My Lovely Girl
Park Yoochun - Three Days
Jo In-sung - It's Okay, That's Love
Joo Sang-wook - Birth of a Beauty
Jun Ji-hyun - My Love from the Star
Kwon Sang-woo - Temptation
Lee Bo-young - God's Gift - 14 Days
Lee Je-hoon - Secret Door
Lee Jong-suk - Pinocchio, Doctor Stranger
Lee Seung-gi - You're All Surrounded 
Park Hae-jin - My Love from the Star, Doctor Stranger
Park Shin-hye - Pinocchio
Park Yoochun - Three Days
| valign="top" |Jo In-sung and Gong Hyo-jin - It's Okay, That's LoveJoo Sang-wook and Han Ye-seul - Birth of a BeautyKim Soo-hyun and Jun Ji-hyun - My Love from the StarLee Jong-suk and Park Shin-hye - PinocchioCho Seung-woo and Lee Bo-young - God's Gift - 14 Days
Jung Ji-hoon (Rain) and Krystal Jung - My Lovely Girl
Kwon Sang-woo and Choi Ji-woo - Temptation
Lee Je-hoon and Park Eun-bin - Secret Door
Lee Sang-yoon and Ku Hye-sun - Angel Eyes
Lee Seung-gi and Go Ara - You're All Surrounded
Park Seo-joon and Han Groo - One Warm Word
Park Yoochun and Park Ha-sun - Three Days
|-
! 
! 
|-
| valign="top" |Jun Ji-hyun - My Love from the Star| valign="top" |Kim Ja-ok' (posthumously accepted by her son)
|}

Top 10 Stars
Han Ye-seul - Birth of a BeautyHwang Jung-eum - Endless LovePark Yoochun - Three DaysJo In-sung - It's Okay, That's LoveJoo Sang-wook - Birth of a BeautyJun Ji-hyun - My Love from the StarKim Soo-hyun - My Love from the StarLee Je-hoon - Secret DoorLee Jong-suk - Pinocchio, Doctor StrangerPark Shin-hye - PinocchioNew Star Award
Ahn Jae-hyun - My Love from the StarHan Groo - One Warm WordHan Sunhwa - God's Gift - 14 DaysKang Ha-neul - Angel EyesKim Yoo-jung - Secret DoorKim Young-kwang - PinocchioLee Yu-bi - PinocchioNam Bo-ra - Only LovePark Seo-joon - One Warm WordSeo Ha-joon - Only Love''

References

External links
 

SBS
SBS Drama Awards
SBS
December 2014 events in South Korea